Longtang is a traditional type of urban alley-community in Shanghai.

Longtang may also refer to:

Longtang, Hainan, China
Longtang, Lianyuan, Loudi City, Hunan Province, China
Longtang, Anhua, Yiyang, Hunan Province, China
 Longtang, Leiyang (龙塘镇), a town of Leiyang City, Hunan.